Jean Thurston Vander Pyl (October 11, 1919 – April 10, 1999) was an American voice actress. Although her career spanned many decades, she is best known as the voice of Wilma Flintstone for the Hanna-Barbera cartoon The Flintstones. In addition to Wilma Flintstone, she also provided the voices of Pebbles Flintstone, Rosie the robot maid on the animated series The Jetsons, Goldie, Lola Glamour, Nurse LaRue, and other characters in Top Cat, Winsome Witch on The Secret Squirrel Show, and Ogee on The Magilla Gorilla Show.

Early life and career
Vander Pyl was born in Philadelphia to John Howard and Kathleen Hale Vander Pyl. Her grandfather had come from the Netherlands. Her father was the district manager for Knit Underwear; her mother was a Southerner from Tennessee. The two died within six months of each other in the early 1950s. By 1939, she was already working as a radio actress.

On radio, she was heard on such programs as The Halls of Ivy (1950–52) and on Father Knows Best during the early 1950s, where she portrayed Margaret Anderson; the role was played on television by Jane Wyatt. Her husband, Carroll G. O'Meara, was a graduate of Stanford University who worked as a copywriter at KHJ radio in the mid-1930s and later became an advertising executive.

Vander Pyl made numerous TV appearances as an actress in programs such as Leave It to Beaver, The Donna Reed Show, Father Knows Best, The Beverly Hillbillies, That Girl, and Petticoat Junction. One of her final TV appearances was in the opening scene of the season-two Murder, She Wrote episode, "One Good Bid Deserves a Murder". Vander Pyl also had a cameo appearance in the 1994 live-action film version of The Flintstones as Mrs. Feldspar, an elderly woman in a conga line right behind Dino.

Voice work
Vander Pyl was the voice of Wilma Flintstone, her best-known character, in the original Flintstones series. She told an interviewer in 1995 that she received $250 per episode for making The Flintstones, and in 1966, when the series ended, she rushed to accept $15,000 in lieu of residual payments from syndication. The Flintstones ran in syndication across the globe for decades. At the time, Vander Pyl lived in San Clemente, California, and remarked: "If I got residuals, I wouldn't live in San Clemente. I'd own San Clemente."

Most of her other voice acting work was also for the Hanna-Barbera studio, where she played her first voice role in 1958 on an episode of The Huckleberry Hound Show, voicing an actress in the Yogi Bear episode, "Show Biz Bear". She did additional voices, the Narrator and Southern belles and beautiful girls, on The Quick Draw McGraw Show, Snagglepuss, and The Yogi Bear Show. In 1961–62, Vander Pyl played Nurse Larue, Charlie the baby, Goldie, Lola Glamour, and additional voices on multiple episodes of Top Cat and in 1962, she did another memorable role, as Rosie, the Jetsons' robotic maid, and 23 years later in 1985 she reprised the character on the returning series.

Later, she did the voices of Maw Rugg and her daughter Floral Rugg on a rural cartoon, The Hillbilly Bears and Winsome Witch; both shows were part of The Atom Ant/Secret Squirrel Show (1965–1967). Jean Vander Pyl was also the voice of Little Ogee on The Magilla Gorilla Show. In 1969, Vander Pyl guest-starred on the Scooby-Doo, Where Are You! episode "Foul Play in Funland", playing Sarah Jenkins.

In the 1970s, she was the voice of Marge Huddles, the main character's wife on Where's Huddles?, in which she played a role similar to that of Wilma Flintstone and was reunited with her Flintstones cast members Alan Reed and Mel Blanc. She went on to voice Mrs. Finkerton on Inch High, Private Eye, and several female characters on Hong Kong Phooey, The Tom and Jerry Show, and Captain Caveman and the Teen Angels.

In the 1980s and 1990s, she did voices on Mister T, Snorks, and Yogi's Treasure Hunt, and also on The Flintstone Kids as Mrs. Slaghoople. She mostly reprised Wilma Flintstone on spin-off series and films such as The Flintstone Comedy Hour, The New Fred and Barney Show, The Flintstone Comedy Show, The Jetsons Meet the Flintstones, I Yabba-Dabba Do!, Hollyrock-a-Bye Baby, and A Flintstones Christmas Carol.

Her last roles were again as Wilma Flintstone on What a Cartoon! episode "Dino: Stay Out!" in 1995, A Flintstone Family Christmas in 1996 and on The Weird Al Show in 1997.

Personal life
Vander Pyl was married twice and was a widow twice over. First to Carroll G. O'Meara on March 9, 1939; together they had three children, O'Meara died on February 18, 1962, at the age of 53. She then married her second husband Roger Wells DeWitt in 1963; the couple had one son, they remained married until DeWitt's death in 1992.

Death
On April 10, 1999, Vander Pyl, the last surviving original cast member of The Flintstones, died of lung cancer at her home in Dana Point, California, at the age of 79. Vander Pyl was interred in Ascension Cemetery in Lake Forest, California.

Filmography

Film
Deep in My Heart (1954) - Miss Zimmermann (uncredited)
Hey There, It's Yogi Bear! (1964) - (voice)
The Man Called Flintstone (1966) - Wilma Flintstone (voice)
Santa and the Three Bears (1970) - Nana (voice)
Energy: A National Issue (1977, Short) - Wilma Flintstone (voice)
The Jetsons Meet the Flintstones (1987, TV Movie) - Wilma Flintstone / Rosie / Mrs. Spacely (voice)
Rockin' with Judy Jetson (1988, TV Movie) - Rosie (voice)
Jetsons: The Movie (1990) - Rosie the Robot (voice)
I Yabba-Dabba Do! (1993, TV movie) - Wilma Flintstone / Mrs. Slate (voice)
Hollyrock-a-Bye Baby (1993, TV Movie) - Wilma Flintstone (voice)
The Flintstones (1994) - Mrs. Feldspar
A Flintstones Christmas Carol (1994, TV Movie) - Wilma Flintstone (voice)
 The Flintstones Christmas in Bedrock  (1996, TV Movie) - Wilma Flintstone (voice)

Television

Jane Wyman Presents The Fireside Theatre (1955) -
The Millionaire (1955) - Party Guest
Big Town (1956) -
Medic (1956) - Julia
The Flagstones (1959) - pitch reel pilot - Wilma
The Quick Draw McGraw Show (1959–1961) - the Narrator, various voices
 Leave It To Beaver (1957–1963) - Mrs. Hansen, Mrs. Thompson, Mrs. Woods
Mister Magoo (1960) - various voices
Loopy De Loop (1960–1965) - various voices
The Flintstones (1960–1966) - 166 episodes - Wilma Flintstone, Pebbles Flintstone, additional voices
The Yogi Bear Show (1961) - various voices
Top Cat (1961–1962) - various voices
The Jetsons (1962–1963, 1985–1987) - 45 episodes - Rosie the Robot, Mrs. Spacely
The Magilla Gorilla Show (1964–1966) - 9 episodes - Ogee, Old Lady, Fairy Godmother
The Secret Squirrel Show (1965) - 26 episodes - Winsome Witch, additional voices
The Atom Ant Show (1965–1966) - 26 episodes - Maw Rugg, Floral Rugg
Scooby-Doo, Where Are You! (1969) - five episodes - Mrs. Cutler, Candy Mint, Princess's Owner, Sarah Jenkins, Swami Customer, additional voices 
Where's Huddles? (1970) - 10 episodes - Marge Huddles
The Pebbles and Bamm-Bamm Show (1971–1972) - 10 episodes - Wilma Flintstone
The Tonight Show Starring Johnny Carson (1971) - episode - 11-4-1971 - herself
The ABC Saturday Superstar Movie (1972) - episode - "Yogi's Ark Lark" - Maw Rugg, Floral Rugg, Woman
The Flintstone Comedy Hour (1972) - 18 episodes - Wilma Flintstone
Yogi's Gang (1973) - various voices  
Inch High, Private Eye (1973) - 13 episodes - Mrs. Finkerton
Hong Kong Phooey (1974) - Various
The Tom and Jerry Show - segment - "Mumbly" (1976) - Additional voices
The All New Superfriends Hour - Dr. Xra (in "The Man Beasts of Xra"), Magda Duval (in "The Marsh Monster")
Fred Flintstone and Friends (1977–1978) - 95 episodes - Wilma Flintstone
Captain Caveman and the Teen Angels (1977–1980) - additional voices
A Flintstone Christmas (1977) - TV Special - Wilma Flintstone, Pebbles Flintstone
The Flintstones: Little Big League (1978) - TV special - Wilma Flintstone
The All New Popeye Hour (1978) - segment - "Dinky Dog" - additional voices
The New Fred and Barney Show (1979) - 17 episodes -  Wilma Flintstone, Pebbles Flintstone
Fred and Barney Meet the Thing (1979) - 13 episodes -  Wilma Flintstone, Pebbles Flintstone
The Flintstones Meet Rockula and Frankenstone (1979) - TV special - Wilma Flintstone, Gladys
Fred and Barney Meet the Shmoo (1979–1980) - 17 episodes -  Wilma Flintstone, Pebbles Flintstone
The Flintstones' New Neighbors (1980) - TV special - Wilma Flintstone, Pebbles Flintstone
The Flintstones: Fred's Final Fling (1980) - TV special - Wilma Flintstone, Pebbles Flintstone
The Flintstone Comedy Show (1980–1981) - 18 episodes - Wilma Flintstone
The Flintstones: Wind-Up Wilma (1981) - TV special - Wilma Flintstone, Pebbles Flintstone
The Flintstones: Jogging Fever (1981) - TV special - Wilma Flintstone, Pebbles Flintstone
Rosie (1982) - episode: "Stacey Comes To Visit" - Aunt Linda
The New Scooby and Scrappy-Doo Show (1983) - various voices
Mister T (1983) - various voices
Hardcastle and McCormick (1985) - episode - "Games People Play" - Agnes O'Toole
Snorks (1985) - additional voices
Blacke's Magic (1986) - Older Woman
Murder, She Wrote (1986) - episode - "One Good Bid Deserves a Murder" - Fan
The Flintstones' 25th Anniversary Celebration (1986) - TV Special - Wilma Flintstone
The Flintstone Kids (1986–1988) - 32 episodes - Pearl Slaghoople
The Flintstone Kids' "Just Say No" Special (1988) - TV special - Pearl Slaghoople, various voices
Hanna-Barbera's 50th: A Yabba Dabba Doo Celebration (1989) - TV special - Wilma Flintstone
Wake, Rattle, and Roll (1990) - segment - "Fender Bender 500" - 50 episodes - Winsome Witch
The Funtastic World of Hanna-Barbera (1990) - ride show - Wilma Flintstone, Rosie the Robot
A Flintstone Family Christmas (1993) - TV special - Wilma Flintstone
What a Cartoon! (1995) - episode - "Dino: Stay Out!" - Wilma Flintstone
The Weird Al Show - episode (1997) - "Talent Show" - Wilma Flintstone - (final appearance)

References

External links

1919 births
1999 deaths
Actresses from Philadelphia
American people of Dutch descent
American radio actresses
American television actresses
Deaths from lung cancer in California
Hanna-Barbera people
People from Dana Point, California
20th-century American actresses